Moïse Bambara (born 10 November 1984 in Ouagadougou) is a Burkinabé footballer.

Career 
Bambara began his career with SpVgg Mitterdorf and moved later to ASV Cham. He joined in 2004 1. FC Bad Kötzting and played there two years before transferring to SSV Jahn Regensburg in July 2006. While with Jahn Regensburg, Bambara appeared in 97 league matches and scored eight goals. On 7 June 2009, Bambara left Regensburg and signed with FC Ingolstadt 04 a two-year contract.

During March 2011 it was reported that Portland Timbers of Major League Soccer were interested in signing Bambara.

On 23 July 2012, Bambara signed a one-year contract with German 2. Bundesliga side FSV Frankfurt.

References

External links
 
 
 Moïse Bambara at kicker.de 

1984 births
Burkinabé footballers
Sportspeople from Ouagadougou
Living people
Burkina Faso international footballers
Expatriate footballers in Germany
SSV Jahn Regensburg players
FC Ingolstadt 04 players
FSV Frankfurt players
2. Bundesliga players
3. Liga players
Association football midfielders
Association football wingers
21st-century Burkinabé people